Henry Collins Flagg Jr. (January 5, 1792 – March 8, 1863) was an American lawyer, newspaper editor, and politician. He was the grandfather of Alice Claypoole Vanderbilt.

Early life
Flagg was born in the parish of St. Thomas, near Charleston, South Carolina on January 5, 1792.  His parents were Henry Collins Flagg (1742–1801) and Rachel (née Moore) Flagg (1757–1839).  Flagg's father, whose exact name he bore, served through the American Revolutionary War and was a wealthy shipping merchant from Newport, Rhode Island. Flagg himself was the younger half-brother of painter Washington Allston (1779–1843), from his mother's previous marriage to Captain William Allston, who died in 1781, shortly after the Battle of Cowpens.
 
Some of his early studies were pursued in Newport, Rhode Island. He graduated from Yale College in 1811.

Career
After leaving college he returned to South Carolina, and remained there for some years. He returned to New Haven, Connecticut and studied law with S.P. Staples, Esq., and began to engage in the practice of law. He took an active part in the political movements opposed to the Federalist Party in Connecticut, both as a public speaker and as an editor of the Connecticut Herald, which he had purchased. He was Clerk of the New Haven County Court.

About 1824, he returned to South Carolina, where he practiced law until 1833.  Flagg's attachment to his native State was strong, but his devotion to the Union was stronger, and like his friend, James L. Petigru, with whom, side by side, he withstood the nullifiers in 1832, he was true to the last.  Designing to educate his children at the North, he then again took up his residence in New Haven, where his home continued till his death. He practiced law until 1842 when he retired. From 1834-39 he was Mayor of New Haven.

Personal life
On March 20, 1811, Flagg was married to Martha Whiting (1792–1875), the daughter of William Joseph Whiting. Together, they were the parents of seven children, including:

 Henry Collins Flagg III (1811–1862), who married Olivia Moss Sherman (1816–1903).
 Mary Allston Flagg (1814–1877), who married George Sherman (1808–1889).
 George Whiting Flagg (1816–1897), who married Louisa Henriques.
 William Joseph Flagg (1818–1898), who married Eliza Longworth (1809–1891), daughter of Nicholas Longworth.
 Jared Bradley Flagg (1820–1899), who married Sarah Montague (1823–1844) in 1841, Amelia Louisa Hart (1828–1867) in 1846, and thirdly, Josephine Bond (1832–1911) in 1869.
 Rachel Moore Flagg (1822–1884), who first married Abraham Evan Gwynne (1821–1855) and was the mother of Alice Claypoole Vanderbilt. After his death, she married Albert Mathews (1820–1903).
 Edward Octavius Flagg (1824–1911), who married Mary Letitia Ferris (1839–1926).

His wife and seven children survived him upon his death at age 71, March 8, 1863 in New Haven, Connecticut.

Descendants
Through his daughter Rachel and her first husband Abraham, he was the grandfather of Alice Claypoole Gwynne, who married Cornelius Vanderbilt II in 1867.

Through his son Jared, he was the grandfather of the American architect Ernest Flagg.

References
Notes

Sources

External links
 

1792 births
1863 deaths
Yale College alumni
Editors of Connecticut newspapers
Politicians from Charleston, South Carolina
South Carolina lawyers
Connecticut lawyers
Mayors of New Haven, Connecticut
19th-century American politicians
Lawyers from Charleston, South Carolina
19th-century American lawyers